Perry Mason is an American period drama television series created by Rolin Jones and Ron Fitzgerald for HBO. It is based on the character of the same name by Erle Stanley Gardner. The series stars Matthew Rhys in the title role and premiered on June 21, 2020.

In July 2020, HBO renewed the series for a second season. In April 2021, it was announced that Jones and Fitzgerald left the series and were replaced as showrunners by Jack Amiel and Michael Begler. The second season premiered on March 6, 2023. Both seasons have received mostly positive critical reviews, with praise going towards the cinematography, production design, and performances of its cast, particularly Rhys.

Premise
The series focuses on the origin story of famed defense lawyer Perry Mason. In 1932, Los Angeles is prospering while the rest of the U.S. is recovering from the grip of the Great Depression. Down-and-out private investigator Perry Mason is struggling with his trauma from The Great War and being divorced. He is hired for a sensational child kidnapping trial; his investigation results in major consequences for Mason, those around him, and local leaders.

Cast and characters

Main
Matthew Rhys as Perry Mason, a low-rent private investigator who later becomes a lawyer
Juliet Rylance as Della Street, the loyal and driven legal secretary of E.B. Jonathan
Chris Chalk as Paul Drake, a beat cop with a knack for detective work
Shea Whigham as Pete Strickland (season 1; recurring season 2), Mason's work partner
Tatiana Maslany as Sister Alice McKeegan (season 1), a preacher and leader of the Radiant Assembly of God
John Lithgow as Elias Birchard "E.B." Jonathan (season 1), a struggling attorney and regular employer of Perry Mason
Justin Kirk as Hamilton Burger (season 2; recurring season 1), assistant district attorney offering Mason legal advice
Diarra Kilpatrick as Clara Drake (season 2; recurring season 1), Paul's wife
Eric Lange as Gene Holcomb (season 2; recurring season 1), an LAPD homicide detective
Katherine Waterston as Ginny Aimes (season 2), an optimistic schoolteacher of Perry's son, Teddy

Recurring
Verónica Falcón as Lupe Gibbs, an accomplished pilot and the owner of a speakeasy who has a sexual relationship with Mason
Jefferson Mays as Virgil Sheets, an attendant at the city morgue and a friend of Mason's
Molly Ephraim as Hazel Prystock, a hand model who is Della's fellow boarding house tenant and secret romantic partner
Gretchen Mol as Linda Mason, Perry's ex-wife

Season 1
Gayle Rankin as Emily Dodson, the mother of Charlie Dodson, a one-year-old child who is mysteriously kidnapped and murdered
Nate Corddry as Matthew Dodson, a grocery store owner whose one-year-old son, Charlie, is kidnapped and murdered
Stephen Root as Maynard Barnes, the formidable district attorney of Los Angeles County
Andrew Howard as Joe Ennis, an LAPD homicide detective
Robert Patrick as Herman Baggerly, Matthew's father, a powerful industrialist in Southern California who hires E.B. and Mason to investigate the kidnapping
Lili Taylor as Birdy McKeegan, Alice's mother and advisor
Matt Frewer as Judge Frederick "Fred" Wright, the judge in the Charlie Dodson murder case
David Wilson Barnes as Elder Brown, a member of the Radiant Assembly of God
Taylor Nichols as Elder/Deacon Eric Q. Seidel, a member of the Radiant Assembly of God
Aaron Stanford as George "Pinky Ring" Gannon, a man with a critical connection to the Dodson case
Jenny O'Hara as June Pitlick, the owner of the boarding house where Della Street lives
Michael McMillian as Oliver Fogg, one of Della's fellow lodgers
Todd Weeks as Jim Hicks, an accountant who worked for George Gannon and others
Andrew Divoff as Al Howard, the owner of the casino where George Gannon worked

Season 2
Tommy Dewey as Brooks McCutcheon, a wealthy businessman and a philanthropist with aspirations to bring a baseball team to Los Angeles; he also has a darker side 
Paul Raci as Lydell McCutcheon, Brooks' father
Jee Young Han as Marion Kang, Perry's new secretary
Sean Astin as Sunny Gryce, a dueling supermarket owner Perry represents
Jen Tullock as Anita St. Pierre, a self-made screenwriter Della meets and is attracted to
Mark O'Brien as Thomas Milligan, Hamilton Burger's deputy in charge of the Brooks McCutcheon murder case
Onohoua Rodriguez as Luisa Gallardo, the aunt of the Gallardo brothers who are accused of murdering Brooks McCutcheon
Fabrizio Guido as Rafael Gallardo, a Mexican-American artist accused of murdering McCutcheon 
Peter Mendoza as Mateo Gallardo, Rafael's unemployed elder brother, also accused of murdering McCutcheon
Hope Davis as Camilla Nygaard
Andrea Gabriel as Constance Barbour, a gifted pianist once taught by Camilla
Jon Chaffin as Morris, Clara's brother
Wallace Langham as Melville Phipps

Episodes

Season 1 (2020)

Season 2 (2023)

Production

Development
On August 15, 2016, it was reported that HBO was developing a drama series based on the Perry Mason stories written by Erle Stanley Gardner. The production was expected to be written by Nic Pizzolatto, who was also set to executive produce alongside Robert Downey Jr. and Joe Horacek. Production companies involved with the series were slated to consist of Team Downey. On August 25, 2017, it was announced that Pizzolatto had dropped out of the production in order to focus on the third season of True Detective and that he was being replaced as the project's writer by Rolin Jones and Ron Fitzgerald. The HBO revival and reboot adapted its setting to Great Depression-era Los Angeles, some twenty years earlier than the CBS show (but in line with the earliest novels by Gardner).

On January 14, 2019, it was announced that HBO had given the production an order as a limited series. It was further announced that Jones, Fitzgerald, Susan Downey, and Amanda Burrell would serve as additional executive producers, that Matthew Rhys would serve as a producer, and that the production was in the process of hiring a director. Jones and Fitzgerald serve as showrunners for the series as well. In March, Tim Van Patten was announced as director and executive producer. On July 22, 2020, it was revealed HBO had decided to turn Perry Mason into a regular series, renewing it for a second season. On April 23, 2021, it was announced Jones and Fitzgerald left the series and were replaced as showrunners by Jack Amiel and Michael Begler.

Casting
Alongside the initial development announcement, it was said that Robert Downey Jr. would star as the titular Perry Mason. On July 25, 2018, it was reported that Downey had dropped out of the role due to his feature film schedule and that a search for his replacement was ongoing. On January 14, 2019, it was announced that Matthew Rhys had been cast to replace Downey. Tatiana Maslany joined in April. John Lithgow was added to the cast in May. In June, Chris Chalk and Shea Whigham were cast in lead roles, with Nate Corddry, Veronica Falcón, Jefferson Mays, Gayle Rankin and Lili Taylor set in recurring roles. Juliet Rylance, Andrew Howard, Eric Lange, Robert Patrick and Stephen Root joined in July. Justin Kirk would be added in October. In "Chapter Five", John Lithgow's real-life son Ian Lithgow appears as Byron Jonathan, E.B. Jonathan's son.

For the second season, Lange and Kirk were promoted to series regulars. Diarra Kilpatrick, who recurred in season 1 as Clara Drake, was upgraded to series regular in October 2021 in addition to Katherine Waterston joining as a new series regular, and Hope Davis among 5 cast in recurring roles. In January 2022, it was announced Whigham would be returning in a recurring capacity, while Sean Astin, Tommy Dewey, Paul Raci and Jen Tullock were cast in recurring roles.

Release
The series premiered on June 21, 2020, on HBO and HBO Max. The second season premiered on March 6, 2023.

Home media
The first season was released on Blu-ray and DVD on December 1, 2020.

Reception

Critical response
On review aggregator website Rotten Tomatoes, season one holds an approval rating of 75% based on 84 reviews, with an average rating of 7.3/10. The site's critics consensus reads: "Brimming with top notch performances and dripping in style, Perry Masons compelling mystery more than makes up for its somewhat messy story." On Metacritic, the season has a weighted average score of 68 out of 100, based on 39 critics, indicating "generally favorable reviews".

Ben Travers of IndieWire said that season one is "built with confidence, patience, and a voice calibrated for today's audiences" and gave it a "B+", writing: "Perry Mason stands as an astounding visual feat for its specific framings as well as its overall world-building. There are striking images of a pitch-black profile and lavish outdoor shots of real Los Angeles locations. In some shows, intimate conversations between two people can clash with the grander scenes... Mason has the intuition (and the budget) to not just balance visual opulence with smaller, private moments, but to blend them."

Season two holds an approval rating of 84% based on 25 reviews, with an average rating of 7.2/10. The site's critics consensus reads: "More cohesive and engaging than its woolly first installment, Perry Masons sophomore season is a marked improvement driven by an urgent sense of purpose, with Matthew Rhys commandingly watchable as ever." On Metacritic, the season has a weighted average score of 70 out of 100, based on 18 critics, indicating "generally favorable reviews".

Ratings
With 1.7 million viewers across all platforms, the debut of Perry Mason was the strongest of any HBO series for two years.

Season 1

Season 2

Accolades

Notes

References

External links
 
 

Perry Mason
2020 American television series debuts
2020s American crime drama television series
2020s American legal television series
American detective television series
English-language television shows
Great Depression television series
HBO original programming
Neo-noir television series
Serial drama television series
Television series reboots
Television series set in 1932
Television shows based on American novels
Television shows set in Los Angeles
Television series by Home Box Office